Dischord Records is an independent record label specializing in the punk rock music of the Washington, D.C., hardcore scene.  The company is co-owned by Ian MacKaye and Jeff Nelson, who founded the label in December 1980.  Before founding Dischord, both MacKaye and Nelson were members of the Teen Idles, and the label was initially meant to only foster a single release from the defunct band, the Minor Disturbance EP.  By the time Dischord #1 was finished, many new bands had emerged from the same music scene, and like the Teen Idles, also began releasing their records through Dischord.

Bands such as Minor Threat, Government Issue, The Faith, Void, Youth Brigade, Iron Cross, Embrace, Rites of Spring, The Nation of Ulysses, The Make-Up, Scream, Soulside, Gray Matter, Jawbox, Marginal Man, Shudder to Think, Dag Nasty, Lungfish  and Fugazi have released records on the label.  More recent additions to the Dischord roster include Q and Not U, Beauty Pill, Faraquet, Black Eyes, and The Aquarium.

Catalog
This list is organized by catalog number, a roughly chronological number system established by the label and typically printed on or assigned to each official release.  However, unlike many record labels with similar systems, smaller releases such as singles, split albums, and co-releases with other labels have often been assigned a catalog number using a fraction or decimal.
{|class="wikitable"
! Year
! No.
! Artist
! Title
! Co-releases
|-
| style="text-align:center;"|1980
| style="text-align:center;"|1
|Teen Idles
|Minor Disturbance
|
|-
| style="text-align:center;" rowspan="6"|1981
| style="text-align:center;"|2
|State of Alert
|No Policy
|
|-
| style="text-align:center;"|3
|Minor Threat
|Minor Threat (7-inch EP)
|
|-
| style="text-align:center;"|4
|Government Issue
|Legless Bull
|
|-
| style="text-align:center;"|4½
|Necros
|I.Q. 32
|Touch and Go Records
|-
| style="text-align:center;"|5
|Minor Threat
|In My Eyes
|Limp Records
|-
| style="text-align:center;"|6
|Youth Brigade
|Possible
|
|-
| style="text-align:center;" rowspan="4"|1982
| style="text-align:center;"|7
|Various artists
|Flex Your Head
|Alternative Tentacles(UK release)
|-
| style="text-align:center;"|7½
|SSD
|The Kids Will Have Their Say
|X-Claim Records
|-
| style="text-align:center;"|8
|Void / Faith
|Void/Faith split
|
|-
| style="text-align:center;"|8½
|Iron Cross
|Skinhead Glory
|Skinflint Records
|-
| style="text-align:center;" rowspan="6"|1983
| style="text-align:center;"|9
|Scream
|Still Screaming
|
|-
| style="text-align:center;"|10
|Minor Threat
|Out of Step
|
|-
| style="text-align:center;"|10½
|Double-O
|You've Lost
|R & B Records
|-
| style="text-align:center;"|10¾
|Government Issue
|Boycott Stabb
|Fountain of Youth RecordsGiant Records (2nd pressing)
|-
| style="text-align:center;"|10⅞
|United Mutation
|Fugitive Family
|DSI Records
|-
| style="text-align:center;"|11
|Faith
|Subject to Change
|
|-
| style="text-align:center;" rowspan="3"|1984
| style="text-align:center;"|12
|Minor Threat
|Minor Threat (compilation)
|
|-
| style="text-align:center;"|13
|Marginal Man
|Identity
|
|-
| style="text-align:center;"|14
|Various artists
|Dischord 1981: The Year in 7″s
|
|-
| style="text-align:center;" rowspan="5"|1985
| style="text-align:center;"|15
|Minor Threat
|Salad Days
|
|-
| style="text-align:center;"|15½
|Scream
|This Side Up
|Rough Trade Records
|-
| style="text-align:center;"|15¾
|Reptile House
|I Stumble as the Crow Flies
|Druid Hill
|-
| style="text-align:center;"|16
|Rites of Spring
|Rites of Spring
|
|-
| style="text-align:center;"|17
|Beefeater
|Plays for Lovers
|
|-
| style="text-align:center;" rowspan="5"|1986
| style="text-align:center;"|17½
|Mission Impossible /Lünchmeat
|Thanks / Getting Shit for Growing up Different
|Sammich Records
|-
| style="text-align:center;"|18
|The Snakes
|I Won't Love You 'til You're More Like Me
|Discard Records
|-
| style="text-align:center;"|19
|Dag Nasty
|Can I Say
|
|-
| style="text-align:center;"|20
|Egg Hunt
|"Me and You"
|
|-
| style="text-align:center;"|21
|Gray Matter
|Take it Back
|
|-
| style="text-align:center;"|1987
| style="text-align:center;"|22
|Rites of Spring
|All Through a Life
|
|-
| style="text-align:center;"|1986
| style="text-align:center;"|22½
|Soul Side
|Less Deep Inside Keeps
|Sammich Records
|-
| style="text-align:center;" rowspan="5"|1987
| style="text-align:center;"|23
|Beefeater
|House Burning Down
|
|-
| style="text-align:center;"|24
|Embrace
|Embrace
|
|-
| style="text-align:center;"|25
|Scream
|Banging the Drum
|
|-
| style="text-align:center;"|26
|Dag Nasty
|Wig Out at Denko's
|
|-
| style="text-align:center;"|26½
|Ignition
|Anger Means / Proven Hollow
|Ig Records
|-
| style="text-align:center;" rowspan="6"|1988
| style="text-align:center;"|26¾
|Shudder to Think
|It Was Arson
|Sammich Records
|-
| style="text-align:center;"|27
|Minor Threat
|Live
|
|-
| style="text-align:center;"|28
|Fire Party
|Fire Party
|
|-
| style="text-align:center;"|29
|Soul Side
|Trigger
|Sammich Records
|-
| style="text-align:center;"|30
|Fugazi
|Fugazi
|
|-
| style="text-align:center;"|31
|Ignition
|Machination
|Ig Records
|-
| style="text-align:center;" rowspan="2"|1989
| style="text-align:center;"|32
|Various artists
|State of the Union
|
|-
| style="text-align:center;"|33
|Three
|Dark Days Coming
|
|-
| style="text-align:center;"|1990
| style="text-align:center;"|33⅓
|Vile Cherubs
|Post Humorous Relief
|Cherubic Delusions
|-
| style="text-align:center;" rowspan="6"|1989
| style="text-align:center;"|33⅔
|Holy Rollers
|Origami Sessions
|Adult Swim Records
|-
| style="text-align:center;"|34
|Soul Side
|Bass / 103
|
|-
| style="text-align:center;"|35
|rowspan="2"|Fugazi
|Margin Walker
|
|-
| style="text-align:center;"|36
|13 Songs
|
|-
| style="text-align:center;"|37
|Fire Party
|New Orleans Opera
|
|-
| style="text-align:center;"|38
|Soul Side
|Hot Bodi-Gram
|
|-
| style="text-align:center;" rowspan="2"|1990
| style="text-align:center;"|39
|Ignition
|Orafying Mysticle
|
|-
| style="text-align:center;"|40
|Minor Threat
|Complete Discography
|
|-
| style="text-align:center;"|1989
| style="text-align:center;"|41
|Fidelity Jones
|Piltdown Lad
|
|-
| style="text-align:center;"|1991
| style="text-align:center;"|42
|Holy Rollers
|As Is
|
|-
| style="text-align:center;" rowspan="9"|1990
| style="text-align:center;"|43
|rowspan="3"|Fugazi
|3 Songs
|Sub Pop Singles Club
|-
| style="text-align:center;"|44
|Repeater
|
|-
| style="text-align:center;"|45
|Repeater + 3 Songs
|
|-
| style="text-align:center;"|45½
|Jawbox
|Jawbox
|DeSoto Records
|-
| style="text-align:center;"|46
|Shudder to Think
|Ten Spot
|
|-
| style="text-align:center;"|46½
|Nation of Ulysses
|Nation of Ulysses
|K Records
|-
| style="text-align:center;"|47
|Fidelity Jones
|Venus on Lovely
|
|-
| style="text-align:center;"|48
|rowspan="2"|Gray Matter
|Food for Thought
|
|-
| style="text-align:center;"|49
|Food for Thought/Take It Back
|
|-
| style="text-align:center;"|1991
| style="text-align:center;"|50
|Skewbald/Grand Union
|Skewbald/Grand Union
|
|-
| style="text-align:center;" rowspan="3"|1990
| style="text-align:center;"|50½ a
|Lungfish
|Necklace of Heads
|Simple Machines
|-
| style="text-align:center;"|50½ b
|The Snakes
|Happy
|Adult Swim Records
|-
| style="text-align:center;"|51
|Soul Side
|Soon Come Happy
|
|-
| style="text-align:center;" rowspan="12"|1991
| style="text-align:center;"|52
|Jawbox
|Grippe
|
|-
| style="text-align:center;"|53
|Dag Nasty
|Can I Say / Wig Out
|
|-
| style="text-align:center;"|54
|rowspan="2"|Shudder to Think
|Funeral at the Movies
|
|-
| style="text-align:center;"|55
|Funeral at the Movies and Ten Spot
|
|-
| style="text-align:center;"|56
|High Back Chairs
|Of Two Minds
|
|-
| style="text-align:center;"|57
|Nation of Ulysses
|13-Point Program to Destroy America
|
|-
| style="text-align:center;"|57½
|Severin
|Fire and Sand
|Superbad Records
|-
| style="text-align:center;"|58
|Holy Rollers
|Fabuley
|
|-
| style="text-align:center;"|58½
|Gray Matter
|4 Songs
|WGNS
|-
| style="text-align:center;"|59
|Holy Rollers
|Fabuley / As Is
|
|-
| style="text-align:center;"|60
|Fugazi
|Steady Diet of Nothing
|
|-
| style="text-align:center;"|60½
|Autoclave
|Go Far
|K Records
|-
| style="text-align:center;" rowspan="12"|1992
| style="text-align:center;"|61
|Jawbox
|Tongues
|
|-
| style="text-align:center;"|61½
|Desiderata
|Desiderata
|Desiderata
|-
| style="text-align:center;"|62
|Nation of Ulysses
|The Birth of a Ulysses Aesthetic:The Synthesis of Speed and Transformation
|
|-
| style="text-align:center;"|63
|Circus Lupus
|Super Genius
|
|-
| style="text-align:center;"|64
|Beefeater
|Plays for Lovers and House Burning Down
|
|-
| style="text-align:center;"|65
|Lungfish
|Talking Songs for Walking
|
|-
| style="text-align:center;"|65½
|Autoclave
|6 Songs
|Mira Records
|-
| style="text-align:center;"|66
|Lungfish
|Talking Songs for Walking / Simple Machines
|
|-
| style="text-align:center;"|67
|Shudder to Think
|Get Your Goat
|
|-
| style="text-align:center;"|68
|Gray Matter
|Thog
|
|-
| style="text-align:center;"|68.72
|Gray Matter / Severin
|split
|Superbad Records
|-
| style="text-align:center;"|69
|Jawbox
|Novelty
|
|-
|1993
| style="text-align:center;"|70
|Fugazi
|In on the Kill Taker
|
|-
| style="text-align:center;" rowspan="9"|1992
| style="text-align:center;"|71
|Nation of Ulysses
|Plays Pretty for Baby
|
|-
| style="text-align:center;"|72
|Severin
|Acid to Ashes and Rust to Dust
|
|-
| style="text-align:center;"|72½
|Severin
|Smash Hits
|
|-
| style="text-align:center;"|73
|Circus Lupus
|Circus Lupus
|
|-
| style="text-align:center;"|74
|rowspan="2"|High Back Chairs
|Share / One Small Step
|
|-
| style="text-align:center;"|75
|Curiosity and Relief
|
|-
| style="text-align:center;"|75½
|Circus Lupus / Trenchmouth
|split
|Skene! Records
|-
| style="text-align:center;"|76
|Shudder to Think
|Hit Liquor
|
|-
| style="text-align:center;"|76½
|Suture
|Suture
|Decomposition Records
|-
| style="text-align:center;" rowspan="4"|1993
| style="text-align:center;"|77
|Jawbox
|Jackpot Plus!
|
|-
| style="text-align:center;"|77.7
|Jawbox / Tar
|Static (split)
|Touch and Go Records
|-
| style="text-align:center;"|78
|Lungfish
|Rainbows from Atoms
|
|-
| style="text-align:center;"|79
|Circus Lupus
|Solid Brass
|
|-
| style="text-align:center;"|1992
| style="text-align:center;"|79½
|Hoover
|Sidecar Freddie
|Hoover Limited
|-
| style="text-align:center;"|1999
| style="text-align:center;"|80
|Fugazi
|Instrument
|
|-
| style="text-align:center;" rowspan="9"|1993
| style="text-align:center;"|81
|rowspan="3"|Scream
|Still Screaming / This Side Up
|
|-
| style="text-align:center;"|82
|Fumble / Banging the Drum
|
|-
| style="text-align:center;"|83
|Fumble
|
|-
| style="text-align:center;"|84
|Holy Rollers
|Toy
|
|-
| style="text-align:center;"|85
|Slant 6
|What Kind of Monster Are You
|
|-
| style="text-align:center;"|85½
|Rain Like the Sound of Trains
|Washington Bullets
|Rebel Music
|-
| style="text-align:center;"|86
|Holy Rollers
|Holy Rollers
|
|-
| style="text-align:center;"|86½
|Hoover
|Private
|Hoover Limited
|-
| style="text-align:center;"|87
|Faith/Void
|Faith/Void/Faith
|
|-
| style="text-align:center;" rowspan="2"|1994
| style="text-align:center;"|87½
|Rain Like the Sound of Trains
|Bad Man's Grave
|Rebel Music
|-
| style="text-align:center;"|88
|Ignition
|Complete Services
|
|-
| style="text-align:center;" rowspan="2"|1995
| style="text-align:center;"|89
|Hoover
|Lurid Traversal of Rte. 7
|
|-
| style="text-align:center;"|90
|Fugazi
|Red Medicine
|
|-
| style="text-align:center;"|1994
| style="text-align:center;"|91
|Slant 6
|Soda Pop-Rip Off
|
|-
| style="text-align:center;"|1995
| style="text-align:center;"|91½
|Norman Mayer Group
|Point Blank / Ketchup
|Mira Records
|-
| style="text-align:center;" rowspan="2"|1994
| style="text-align:center;"|92
|Lungfish
|Pass and Stow
|
|-
| style="text-align:center;"|92½
|Severin
|Upside Down
|Superbad Records
|-
| style="text-align:center;" rowspan="8"|1995
| style="text-align:center;"|93
|Trusty
|Goodbye, Dr. Fate
|
|-
| style="text-align:center;"|93½
|Las Mordidas
|Surrounded
|Compulsiv Records
|-
| style="text-align:center;"|94
|Slant 6
|Inzombia
|
|-
| style="text-align:center;"|94½
|Antimony
|Red Herring 
|Regulus Records
|-
| style="text-align:center;"|95
|Branch Manager
|Branch Manager
|
|-
| style="text-align:center;"|95½
|Tone
|Build
|Independent Projects Records
|-
| style="text-align:center;"|96
|Smart Went Crazy
|Now We're Even
|
|-
| style="text-align:center;"|96½
|Rain Like the Sound of Trains
|Rain Like the Sound of Trains
|Rebel Music
|-
| style="text-align:center;" rowspan="18"|1996
| style="text-align:center;"|97
|Lungfish
|Sound in Time
|
|-
| style="text-align:center;"|97½
|Norman Mayer Group
|Real Heart
|Monumental Recordings
|-
| style="text-align:center;"|97¾
|Second Thought
|Lily's Stroke
|Liberation Communications
|-
| style="text-align:center;"|98
|The Crownhate Ruin
|Until the Eagle Grins
|
|-
| style="text-align:center;"|98½
|The Delta 72
|On the Rocks
|Kill Rock Stars
|-
| style="text-align:center;"|98¾
|Corm
|The Conservation of Momentum
|Shute Records
|-
| style="text-align:center;"|99
|The Make-Up
|Destination: Love - Live! At Cold Rice
|
|-
| style="text-align:center;"|99½
|Lungfish
|2 Songs
|Walker Records
|-
| style="text-align:center;"|99¾
|Red Eye
|Special Delivery to My Heart
|Decomposition Records
|-
| style="text-align:center;"|100
|Teen Idles
|Anniversary
|
|-
| style="text-align:center;"|100½
|The Warmers
|Thin Air
|The Warmers
|-
| style="text-align:center;"|101
|rowspan="2"|Bluetip
|Dischord No. 101
|
|-
| style="text-align:center;"|101½
|Past Tense
|Hellfire Records
|-
| style="text-align:center;"|102
|The Warmers
|The Warmers
|
|-
| style="text-align:center;"|102½
|Norman Mayer Group
|Moody
|Monumental Recordings
|-
| style="text-align:center;"|103
|Fire Party
|19 Songs
|
|-
| style="text-align:center;"|103½
|Sevens
|12:12 / Enemy
|Akashik Records
|-
| style="text-align:center;"|104
|Trusty
|The Fourth Wise Man
|
|-
| style="text-align:center;" rowspan="8"|1997
| style="text-align:center;"|104½
|The Crownhate Ruin
|Intermediate
|T. C. Ruin
|-
| style="text-align:center;"|105
|The Make-Up
|After Dark
|
|-
| style="text-align:center;"|105½
|The Meta-Matics
|The Meta-Matics
|Slowdime records
|-
| style="text-align:center;"|106
|Lungfish
|Indivisible
|
|-
| style="text-align:center;"|106½
|Tone
|Sustain
|Independent Projects Records
|-
| style="text-align:center;"|107
|Branch Manager
|Anything Tribal
|
|-
| style="text-align:center;"|107½
|Regulator Watts
|The Mercury EP
|Slowdime Records
|-
| style="text-align:center;"|108
|Autoclave
|Combined
|
|-
| style="text-align:center;"|1998
| style="text-align:center;"|108½
|Corm
|Audio Flame Kit
|Shute Records
|-
| style="text-align:center;"|1999
| style="text-align:center;"|109
|Happy Go Licky
|Will Play
|
|-
| style="text-align:center;" rowspan="5"|1998
| style="text-align:center;"|109½
|Mud
|Train to Forever
|Radiopaque Records
|-
| style="text-align:center;"|110
|Fugazi
|End Hits
|
|-
| style="text-align:center;"|110½
|Capitol City Dusters
|Forest Fire
|Superbad Records
|-
| style="text-align:center;"|111
|Bluetip
|Dischord No. 111
|
|-
| style="text-align:center;"|111½
|Kerosene 454
|Came By to Kill Me
|Slowdime Records
|-
| style="text-align:center;"|1997
| style="text-align:center;"|112
|Smart Went Crazy
|Con Art
|
|-
| style="text-align:center;" rowspan="8"|1998
| style="text-align:center;"|112½
|Norman Mayer Group
|In Memory of Norman Mayer
|Monumental Recordings
|-
| style="text-align:center;"|113
|The Make-Up
|In Mass Mind
|Black Gemini Records
|-
| style="text-align:center;"|113½
|Regulator Watts
|New Low Moline
|Slowdime Records
|-
| style="text-align:center;"|114
|The Make-Up
|Blue Is Beautiful
|
|-
| style="text-align:center;"|114½
|Edsel
|Edsel
|Radiopaque Records
|-
| style="text-align:center;"|115
|Lungfish
|Artificial Horizon
|
|-
| style="text-align:center;"|115½
|The Monorchid
|Let them Eat the Monorchid
|Simple Machines
|-
| style="text-align:center;"|116
|Bluetip
|Join Us
|
|-
| style="text-align:center;" rowspan="5"|1999
| style="text-align:center;"|116½
|Candy Machine
|Tune International
|DeSoto Records
|-
| style="text-align:center;"|117
|Lungfish
|The Unanimous Hour
|
|-
| style="text-align:center;"|117½
|Capitol City Dusters /The Most Secret Method
|split
|Superbad Records
|-
| style="text-align:center;"|118
|One Last Wish
|1986
|
|-
| style="text-align:center;"|118½
|All Scars
|Early Ambient
|Slowdime Records
|-
| style="text-align:center;"|2000
| style="text-align:center;"|119
|Lungfish
|Necrophones
|
|-
| style="text-align:center;" rowspan="3"|1999
| style="text-align:center;"|119½
|Regulator Watts
|The Aesthetics of No-Drag
|Slowdime Records
|-
| style="text-align:center;"|120
|Fugazi
|Instrument Soundtrack
|
|-
| style="text-align:center;"|120½
|Stigmatics
|2 Songs
|Brickthrower Records
|-
| style="text-align:center;" rowspan="8"|2000
| style="text-align:center;"|121
|Bluetip
|Polymer
|
|-
| style="text-align:center;"|121½
|Capitol City Dusters
|Simplicity
|Superbad Records
|-
| style="text-align:center;"|122
|Faraquet
|The View from this Tower
|
|-
| style="text-align:center;"|122½
|Machetres
|Machetres
|Brickthrower Records
|-
| style="text-align:center;"|123
|rowspan="2"|Q and Not U
|No Kill No Beep Beep
|
|-
| style="text-align:center;"|123½
|3 Songs
|DeSoto Records
|-
| style="text-align:center;"|124
|Nation of Ulysses
|The Embassy Tapes
|
|-
| style="text-align:center;"|124½
|Bald Rapunzel
|Diazepam
|Resin Records
|-
| style="text-align:center;"|2002
| style="text-align:center;"|125
|Various artists
|20 Years of Dischord
|
|-
| style="text-align:center;"|2008
| style="text-align:center;"|125A
|Various artists
|20 Years of Dischord: 14 Bonus Tracks 2000-2008
|
|-
| style="text-align:center;"|1999
| style="text-align:center;"|125½
|Capitol City Dusters /Aina
|split
|Superbad Records
|-
| style="text-align:center;"|2001
| style="text-align:center;"|126
|Bluetip
|P.M.A.
|
|-
| style="text-align:center;"|2000
| style="text-align:center;"|126½
|Tone
|Structure
|Brookland Records
|-
| style="text-align:center;"|2002
| style="text-align:center;"|127
|Capitol City Dusters
|Rock Creek
|
|-
| style="text-align:center;"|2001
| style="text-align:center;"|127½
|Edie Sedgwick
|First Reflections
|Mud Memory
|-
| style="text-align:center;"|2002
| style="text-align:center;"|128
|El Guapo (Supersystem)
|Super/System
|
|-
| style="text-align:center;" rowspan="4"|2001
| style="text-align:center;"|128½
|Beauty Pill
|The Cigarette Girl from the Future
|DeSoto Records
|
|-
| style="text-align:center;"|129
|Fugazi
|Furniture + 2
|
|-
| style="text-align:center;"|129½
|Cry Baby Cry
|Jesus Loves Stacey
|Skoda Records
|-
| style="text-align:center;"|130
|Fugazi
|The Argument
|
|-
| style="text-align:center;" rowspan="3"|2003
| style="text-align:center;"|130½
|Tone
|Ambient Metals
|Brookland Records
|-
| style="text-align:center;"|131
|Pupils
|Pupils
|
|-
| style="text-align:center;"|131½
|All Scars
|Lunar Magus
|
|-
| style="text-align:center;"|2002
| style="text-align:center;"|132
|Q and Not U
|On Play Patterns
|
|-
| style="text-align:center;"|2003
| style="text-align:center;"|132½
|Antelope
|Antelope
|
|-
| style="text-align:center;"|2002
| style="text-align:center;"|133
|Q and Not U
|Different Damage
|
|-
| style="text-align:center;"|2004
| style="text-align:center;"|133½
|Routineers
|11 songs
|Sammich Records
|-
| style="text-align:center;" rowspan="5"|2003
| style="text-align:center;"|134
|El Guapo (Supersystem)
|Fake French
|
|-
| style="text-align:center;"|135
|Black Eyes
|Black Eyes
|
|-
| style="text-align:center;"|136
|Various artists
|Radio CPR: Begin Live Transmission
|
|-
| style="text-align:center;"|137
|Lungfish
|Love Is Love
|
|-
| style="text-align:center;"|138
|rowspan="2"|Beauty Pill
|You are Right to be Afraid
|
|-
| style="text-align:center;"|2004
| style="text-align:center;"|139
|The Unsustainable Lifestyle
|
|-
| style="text-align:center;" rowspan="2"|2003
| style="text-align:center;"|140
|Minor Threat
|First Demo Tape
|
|-
| style="text-align:center;"|141
|Q and Not U
|2 Songs
|
|-
| style="text-align:center;" rowspan="5"|2004
| style="text-align:center;"|142
|Antelope
|Crowns / The Flock
|
|-
| style="text-align:center;"|143
|Q and Not U
|Power
|
|-
| style="text-align:center;"|144
|The Warmers
|Wanted: More
|
|-
| style="text-align:center;"|145
|Black Eyes
|Cough
|
|-
| style="text-align:center;"|146
|Medications
|5 Songs
|
|-
| style="text-align:center;" rowspan="4"|2005
| style="text-align:center;"|147
|Lungfish
|Feral Hymns
|
|-
| style="text-align:center;"|148
|French Toast
|In a Cave
|
|-
| style="text-align:center;"|149
|Medications
|Your Favorite People All in One Place
|
|-
| style="text-align:center;"|150
|The Evens
|12 Songs
|
|-
| style="text-align:center;" rowspan="6"|2006
| style="text-align:center;"|151
|Channels
|Waiting for the Next End of the World
|
|-
| style="text-align:center;"|152
|Soccer Team
|'Volunteered' Civility and Professionalism
|
|-
| style="text-align:center;"|153
|Joe Lally
|There to Here
|
|-
| style="text-align:center;"|154
|French Toast
|Ingelside Terrace
|
|-
| style="text-align:center;"|155
|The Aquarium
|The Aquarium
|
|-
| style="text-align:center;"|156
|The Make-Up
|In Film/On Video
|
|-
| style="text-align:center;" rowspan="2"|2007
| style="text-align:center;"|157
|Antelope
|Reflector
|
|-
| style="text-align:center;"|158
|Joe Lally
|Nothing Is Underrated
|
|-
| style="text-align:center;"|2008
| style="text-align:center;"|159
|Faraquet
|Anthology 1997-98
|
|-
| style="text-align:center;"|2006
| style="text-align:center;"|160
|The Evens
|Get Evens
|
|-
| style="text-align:center;" rowspan="3"|2007
| style="text-align:center;"|160½
|Fast Piece of Furniture
|Adventures in Contentment
|Adult Swim Records
|-
| style="text-align:center;"|161
|Edie Sedgwick
|Things are Getting Sinister and Sinisterer
|
|-
| style="text-align:center;"|161½
|Deadline
|8/2/82
|
|-
|rowspan="2"|2009
| style="text-align:center;"|162
|Andalusians
|Do the Work
|
|-
| style="text-align:center;"|163
|Title Tracks
|Every Little Bit Hurts
|
|-
| style="text-align:center;"|2007
| style="text-align:center;"|163½
|Rain
|La Vache Qui Rit
|
|-
| style="text-align:center;"|2009
| style="text-align:center;"|164
|Aquarium
|Performer
|
|-
|rowspan="4"|2010
| style="text-align:center;"|165
|Medications
|Completely Removed
|
|-
| style="text-align:center;"|166
|Government Issue
|Boycott Stabb Complete Sessions
|
|-
| style="text-align:center;"|167
|Artificial Peace
|Complete Session, Nov '81
|
|-
| style="text-align:center;"|168
|Dag Nasty
|Dag with Shawn
|
|-
|rowspan="6"|2011
| style="text-align:center;"|168½
|Joe Lally
|Why Should I Get Used to It
|Tolotta Records
|
|-
| style="text-align:center;"|169
|Edie Sedgwick
|Love Gets Lovelier Every Day
|
|-
| style="text-align:center;"|170
|The Evens
|Two Songs
|
|-
| style="text-align:center;"|171
|Void
|Sessions 1981-83
|
|-
| style="text-align:center;"|172
|Faith
|Subject to Change Plus First Demo
|
|-
| style="text-align:center;"|173
|Office of Future Plans
|Office of Future Plans
|
|-
|rowspan="7"|2012
| style="text-align:center;"|174
|Lungfish
|ACR 1999
|
|-
| style="text-align:center;"|174½
|Alarms & Controls
|Reanimus Cataract b/w Kirtland's Warbler
|Mud Memory Records
|
|-
| style="text-align:center;"|175
|E.D. Sedgwick
|We Wear White
|
|-
| style="text-align:center;"|175½
|E.D. Sedgwick
|Heatwave
|Mud Memory Records
|
|-
| style="text-align:center;"|176
|Rites of Spring
|Six Song Demo
|
|-
| style="text-align:center;"|178
|Deathfix
|S/T
|
|-
| style="text-align:center;"|180
|The Evens
|The Odds
|
|-
|rowspan="2"|2013
| style="text-align:center;"|180½
|Red Hare
|Nites of Midnite
| Hellfire
|
|-
| style="text-align:center;"|181½
|Alarms and Controls
|Clovis Points
| Lovitt Records
|
|-
|rowspan="3"|2014
| style="text-align:center;"|181
|Fugazi
|First Demo
|
|-
| style="text-align:center;"|177
|S.O.A
|First Demo 12/29/80
|
|-
| style="text-align:center;"|179
|Soul Side
|Trigger + Bass 103
|
|-
|rowspan="3"|2015
| style="text-align:center;"|182
|Soccer Team
|Real Lessons in Cynicism
|
|-
| style="text-align:center;"|183
|Youth Brigade
|Complete First Demo
|
|-
| style="text-align:center;"|183.5
|Red Hare
|Lexicon Mist
| Hellfire
|
|-
|rowspan="2"|2016
| style="text-align:center;"|184
|Dag Nasty
|Cold Heart
|
|-
| style="text-align:center;"|184.5
|Tone
|Antares
|TminusONEmusic
|
|-
|rowspan="2"|2017
| style="text-align:center;"|185
|The Effects
|Eyes to the Light
|
|-
| style="text-align:center;"|185.5
|Red Hare
|Little Acts of Destruction
| Hellfire
|-
|rowspan="1"|2018
| style="text-align:center;"|186
|The Messthetics
|S/T
|
|-
|rowspan="3"|2019
| style="text-align:center;"|187
|J.Robbins
|Un-becoming
|
|-
| style="text-align:center;"|188
|Hammered Hulls
|S/T
|
|-
| style="text-align:center;"|189
|The Messthetics
|Anthropocosmic Nest
|
|-
| rowspan="2" |2020
|style="text-align:center;"|190
|Coriky
|S/T
|
|-
|style="text-align:center;"|191
|Soul Side
|This Ship
|
|-
| rowspan="2" |2022
|style="text-align:center;"|192
|Soul Side
|A Brief Moment In The Sun
|
|-
|style="text-align:center;"|193
|Hammered Hulls
|Careening
|
|-
| rowspan="1" |2023
|style="text-align:center;"|192.5
|The Owners
|S/T
|Red Room
|-
| rowspan="1" |2022
|style="text-align:center;"|200
|Various
|1st Six - 7" Inch Box Set
|
|-
|}

See also
 List of Dischord Records bands

References

General
  Note: User must navigate to individual band and/or release pages.

  Note: User must navigate to Pop > Label, and enter "Dischord" in text box.  Select first search result.

Specific
(for releases not mentioned in the "General" sources)

External links
Dischord Records website

Discographies of American record labels